Humuya is a municipality in the Honduran department of Comayagua.

Total area of Humuya is 5,300 hectares 53.00 km² (20.46 sq mi) with tropical savanna climate, its altitude is 641 m (2,103 ft) above sea level.

Humuya geographical coordinates: Latitude: 14.25, Longitude: -87.6667 14° 15′ 0″ North, 87° 40′ 0″ West

In Humuya, the peak fire season typically begins in late March and finishes in June (lasts around 3 month). From 2001 to 2021, Humuya has lost 14ha of tree cover due to fires and 130ha from all other drivers of loss.

References

Municipalities of the Comayagua Department